Adriano Panatta was the defending champion, but did not participate this year.

Mark Cox won the title, defeating Manuel Orantes 4–6, 7–5, 7–6 in the final.

Seeds

  Jimmy Connors (semifinals)
  Björn Borg (quarterfinals)

Draw

Finals

Top half

Section 1

Section 2

Bottom half

Section 3

Section 4

External links
 Main draw

Stockholm Open
1976 Grand Prix (tennis)